António da Cunha Meneses Martins Abrantes (born 15 May 1968 in Lisbon) is a retired Portuguese middle-distance runner who specialised in the 800 metres. He represented his country at three consecutive Summer Olympics, starting in 1988, as well as two outdoor and one indoor World Championships.

His personal bests in the event are 1:46.23 outdoors (Maia 1995) and 1:50.94 indoors (Barcelona 1995).

Competition record

References

1968 births
Living people
Portuguese male middle-distance runners
Athletes (track and field) at the 1988 Summer Olympics
Athletes (track and field) at the 1992 Summer Olympics
Athletes (track and field) at the 1996 Summer Olympics
Olympic athletes of Portugal
World Athletics Championships athletes for Portugal
Athletes from Lisbon